The following is a timeline of the history of Charleston, South Carolina, USA.

18th–19th centuries

 1680 – Settlement of English immigrants, mostly from Barbados, relocates from Albemarle Point to site of future Charles Town.
 1681 – St. Philip's Episcopal Church founded.
 1699 - Hurricane and epidemic.
 1708 – African slaves comprise majority of population in the colony; blacks make up majority of population in the city and state until the early 20th century
 1719 – Charles Town renamed "Charlestown" (approximate date).
 1729 – St. Andrew's Society founded.
 1732 – South Carolina Gazette newspaper begins publication.
 1734 – South Carolina Jockey Club constituted.
 1736 – Dock Street Theatre opens.
 1737 – South-Carolina Society founded.
 1739 – Stono Rebellion of slaves occurs near Charleston.
 1740 – Fire.
 1743 – Armory built.
 1745 – Town gate rebuilt.
 1748 – Charleston Library Society organized.
 1750 – Congregation Kahal Kadosh Beth Elohim founded.
 1752 – September: Hurricane.
 1761 – St. Michael's church built.
 1765
 Resistance to British Stamp Act 1765.
 John Bartlam pottery in operation near Charleston.
 1766
 St. Cecilia Society formed.
 German Friendly Society founded.
 1769 – Town becomes part of Charleston District.
 1770
 College of Charleston founded.
 Population: 11,000.
 1771 – Royal Exchange built.
 1773 – Museum founded by the Charleston Library Society.
 1774 – Charleston Tea Party protest.
 1780 – Siege of Charleston.
 1782 – December 14: British occupation ends.
 1783
 Town renamed "Charleston."
 Charter received.
 Richard Hutson becomes mayor.
 City Guard organized.
 1784 – Scotch Presbyterian church incorporated.
 1786
 March: State capital moves from Charleston to Columbia.
 South Carolina Golf Club founded.
 1788 – Charleston becomes part of the new US state of South Carolina.
 1789 – Medical Society of South Carolina founded.
 1790
 College of Charleston opens.
 Population: 16,359.
Brown Fellowship Society founded.
 1791 – Roman Catholic Church of Charleston incorporated. 
 1792
 Charleston Orphan Asylum founded.
 Washington Race Course opens.
 1793 – Charleston Theatre founded. 
 1794 – Charleston Mechanic Society founded.
 1797 – South Carolina Weekly Museum (magazine) begins publication.
 1798 – Bank of South Carolina established.
 1799 – Yellow fever outbreak.
 1800
 Santee Canal (Columbia-Charleston) built.
 Population: 18,824.
 Charleston has largest Jewish population of any city in the US.

19th century

1800s–1830s
 1801 – Hibernian Society founded.
 1803 – Courier newspaper begins publication.
 1806 – Franklin Library Society founded.
 1807 – Washington Light Infantry founded.
 1810
 Castle Pinckney built.
 Population: 24,711.
 1813 – Literary and Philosophical Society of South Carolina founded.
 Ladies Benevolent Society founded.
 1815 – Religious Tract Society of Charleston organized.
 1816 – Emanuel African Methodist Episcopal Church founded.
 1819
 Charleston Mercury newspaper begins publication.
 New England Society of Charleston organized.
 Siegling Music House founded.
 1820
 Roman Catholic Diocese of Charleston established.
 Population: 24,780.
 1822 – Denmark Vesey's alleged rebellion of slaves thwarted.
 1823
 Charleston Port Society founded.
 Medical College of South Carolina incorporated.
 1824
 Apprentices' Library Society incorporated.
 Charleston Museum opens.
 1830 – Population: 30,289.
 1832/33 - Nullification crisis centred in the town.  
 1833 – Charleston-Hamburg railroad begins operating.
 1839
 Charleston Hotel built.
 St. Mary's Roman Catholic Church built.
 1840 – Population: 29,261.
 1841
 Market Hall built.
 Charleston Arsenal built.
 1843 – South Carolina Military Academy opens.
 1844 - Huguenot Church built.
 1847 – Shearith Israel synagogue built.
 1849 – South Carolina Institute for the Promotion of Art, Mechanical Ingenuity, and Industry organized; annual Fair begins.
 1850
 Magnolia Cemetery built.
 Roper Hospital established.
 Population: 42,985.
 1852 – Museum founded by the College of Charleston.
 1853 – Elliott Society of Natural History established.
 1854
 Young Men's Christian Association of Charleston and B'rith Shalom congregation established.
 Old Bethel United Methodist Church rebuilt.
 Cathedral of Saint John and Saint Finbar consecrated.
 Hurricane and epidemic.
 1855 – South Carolina Historical Society founded.
 1856 – Ryan's Mart slave market established.
 1858 – Carolina Art Association established.
 1859 – Charleston Marine School opens.

1860s–1890s

 1860
 April: Democratic National Convention held in city.
 December: Popular outcry for secession from the Union.
 Population: 40,522.
 1861
 January 2: State troops occupy Fort Johnson on James Island.
 January 9 – Citadel cadets fire on Union ship Star of the West.
 April: Battle of Fort Sumter.
 Population: 48,409.
 Floating Battery of Charleston Harbor built.
 Confederate Naval Sailor and Marines' Cemetery built.
 1862
 May 13: Robert Smalls commandeers Confederate ship CSS Planter in Charleston Harbour.
 June 16: Battle of James Island.
 1863
 July–September 7: Siege of Charleston Harbor.
 July 11: First Battle of Fort Wagner.
 July 18: Second Battle of Fort Wagner.
 September 8: Second Battle of Fort Sumter.
 1864 – February 17: Sinking of USS Housatonic in Charleston Harbor.
 1865
 Union troops occupy city.
 In a ceremony with thousands of out-of-town spectators, the Fort Sumter Flag was raised again over Fort Sumter.
 Daily News begins publication.
 St. Mark's Episcopal Church and Avery Normal Institute established.
 Shaw School opens.
 State Colored People's Convention held in city.
 1866
 Colored YMCA established.Negro Yearbook
 Furchgott dry goods store in business.
 1867 – Porter Military Academy formed.
 1868 – January 14: State constitutional convention held in Charleston.
 1869 – Carolina Rifle Club organized.
 1870
 Charleston Female Seminary established.
 Savannah and Charleston Railroad reopened.
 Magnolia Gardens opens.
 Population: 48,956.
 1872 – St. Matthew's German Evangelical Lutheran Church built.
 1879 – United States Custom House built.
 1880 – Population: 49,984.
 1882 – City of Charleston Fire Department and Mount Zion African Methodist Episcopal Church established.
 1883 – Samuel Dibble becomes U.S. representative for South Carolina's 1st congressional district.
 1884 – Robert Smalls becomes U.S. representative for South Carolina's 7th congressional district.
 1886 – August 31: The 6.9–7.3  Charleston earthquake shakes South Carolina with a maximum Mercalli intensity of X (Extreme). Sixty people were killed and damage totalled $5–6 million in the region.
 1889 – William Enston Homes built.
 1890
 East Shore Terminal Company formed.
 Population: 54,955.
 1891 – Central Baptist Church built.
 1893 – August: 1893 Charleston Hurricane.
 1895 – Century Club for women organized.
 1896 – United States Post Office and Courthouse built.
 1899 – Charleston City Federation of Women's Clubs organized.
 1900 – Population: 55,807.

20th century

 1901/2 – South Carolina Inter-State and West Indian Exposition opens.
 1903 – Charleston Terminal Company created.
 1906 – Hampton Park created.
 1907
 Union Station built.
 Cathedral of Saint John the Baptist opens.
 1908 – Gaud School established.
 1909– Ashley Hall established
 1910 – Population: 58,833.
 1911 – People's Office Building constructed.
 1912
 Carolina Arts and Crafts incorporated.
 Read Brothers store established.
 1913 – Charleston Library Society building constructed.
 1917 – National Association for the Advancement of Colored People Charleston branch established.
 1918 – Garden Theatre built.
 1919 — Charleston riot of 1919
 1920
 Society for the Preservation of Old Dwellings founded.
 Lincoln Theatre opens.
 1927 – Gloria Theatre opens.
 1929 – John P. Grace Memorial Bridge opens.
 1930
 Charleston County Library established.
 WCSC radio begins broadcasting.
 1931 – Footlight Players theatre group formed.
 1937 – Dock Street Theatre opens.
 1938 – September 20: Tornado.
 1939 – WTMA radio begins broadcasting.
 1940 – August: 1940 South Carolina hurricane.
 1942 – American Theater opens.
 1945 – 1945–1946 Charleston Cigar Factory strike; singing of We Shall Overcome.Introduction · Charleston's Cigar Factory Strike, 1945-1946 · Lowcountry Digital History InitiativeThe Surprising History of Guy Carawan's Civil-Rights Anthem, "We Shall Overcome"
 1947 – Historic Charleston Foundation established.
 1949 – Johnson Hagood Stadium opens.
 1950 – Ashley Theatre opens.
 1951 – The Links Charleston chapter founded.
 1953 – WCSC-TV (television) begins broadcasting.
 1954 – WUSN-TV (television) begins broadcasting.
 1957 – Fraser Elementary School opens.
 1959 – J. Palmer Gaillard, Jr. becomes mayor.
 1960  
 April 1 - Kress Lunch Counter Sit-In. Twenty-four students from Burke High School, the main African American High School downtown, staged a sit-in protest at the Kress Lunch Counter on King Street.
 1964 – Porter-Gaud School formed.
 1966 – New Cooper River Bridge opens.
 1968 
 Pinehaven Cinema and Gateway Drive-In cinema open.
 The College of Charleston becomes a public college marking the beginning of the transition of the school from being the multi-hundred, private, school it had traditionally been to being the around ten thousand student school it leveled out at in the early 2000s.
 1969 – March 20: Charleston Hospital Strike begins.
 1970
 Port Drive-In cinema opens.
 Charles Towne Landing State Historic Site established.
 1972 – City of North Charleston incorporated, adjacent to City of Charleston.
 1973 – Trident Technical College established.
 1975 – Joseph P. Riley Jr. becomes mayor.
 1977 – Spoleto Festival USA begins.
 1980
 Charleston Royals baseball team founded.
 Population: 69,510.
 1981 – Citadel Mall in business.
 1983 – Lowcountry Food BankAbout Us | Lowcountry Food Bank and sister city relationship with Spoleto, Italy established.
 1985 – College of Charleston's Avery Research Center for African American History and Culture established.
 1989 – Hurricane Hugo.
 1990 – Waterfront Park created.
 1991 – Melvin's BBQ in business.
 1992 – Charleston Grill in business.
 1993
 North Charleston Coliseum opens.
 Charleston Battery soccer team founded.
 1994 – Charleston Tibetan Society founded.
 1995
 Mark Sanford becomes U.S. representative for South Carolina's 1st congressional district.
 Sunken civil war-era submarine Hunley rediscovered offshore.
 1996
 100 Black Men of Charleston established.
 City website online (approximate date).
 1997
 Charleston Area Regional Transportation Authority formed.
 Charleston City Paper begins publication.
 Joseph P. Riley Jr. Park stadium opens.
 2000 
 South Carolina Aquarium opens.
 The Hunley is raised from the seabed and placed in a museum in North Charleston

21st century

 2003 – Charleston School of Law established.
 2004 – Charleston Comedy Festival begins.
 2005 
 July 16: Cooper River Bridge opens.
 2006 – Central Mosque of Charleston founded.
 2007
 Old Slave Mart museum opens.
 Sofa Super Store fire.
 2008 – TD Arena and Meeting Street Academy History | Meeting Street Schools - Closing the Opportunity Gap open.
 2010
 Husk restaurant in business.
 The Charleston Promise Neighborhood incorporated.
 Population: 120,083.
 2011 – Tim Scott becomes U.S. representative for South Carolina's 1st congressional district.
 2015
 June 17: Nine people are killed, including the senior pastor and state senator Clementa C. Pinckney, at the Emanuel African Methodist Episcopal Church, by Dylann Roof, in the Charleston church shooting.
 June 26: Funeral of Clementa Pinckney; U.S. President Barack Obama delivers eulogy.
 November 17: John Tecklenburg is elected mayor in a runoff election, the first new mayor since 1975
 November: Dramatic increase of the homeless camp under the Cooper River Bridge from roughly ten to over 600 residents. The primary cause is the increase in housing prices and a significant percentage of the camp residents had jobs but could not afford living accommodations.
 2017
 January 20: Local anti-Trump inauguration protest held at Brittlebank Park has ~2,000 attendees.
 2018
 Joe Cunningham is elected as the first Democratic congressional representative in decades and the first left-leaning Democrat in the history of South Carolina's 1st congressional district.
 2019
 January: The Dutch Dialogues begin. Facing the threat of global warming raising the sea level, the city government began official communication with officials in The Netherlands to help design and craft solutions to the massive flooding to come.
 November 18: John Tecklenburg is reelected mayor after a runoff against Mike Seekings, with significant issues being concerns over flooding, tourism, new development, and housing prices
 Autumn: Mumps outbreak at the College of Charleston has over 75 cases

See also
 History of Charleston, South Carolina
 List of mayors of Charleston, South Carolina
 National Register of Historic Places listings in Charleston, South Carolina
 Media in Charleston, South Carolina
 List of museums in Charleston, South Carolina
 Charleston, South Carolina in the American Civil War
Other cities in South Carolina:
 Timeline of Columbia, South Carolina

References

Bibliography

Published in 19th century
 
 City Directory. 1852; 1882 ; 1888
 City government annual report. 1870.

Published in 20th century
 City of Charleston. Year Book. 1903 ; 1907 ; 1910 
 
 
 
  + Chronology
 George C. Rogers Jr. Charleston in the Age of the Pinckneys. Norman: University of Oklahoma Press, 1969. 
 
 
 Walter J. Fraser Jr. Charleston! Charleston!: The History of a Southern City. Columbia: University of South Carolina Press, 1989. 
 
  (fulltext via Open Library)
 Hamer, Fritz P.  Charleston Reborn: A Southern City, Its Navy Yard, and World War II (The History Press, 2005).
 Hamer, Fritz.  "Giving a Sense of Achievement: Changing Gender and Racial Roles in Wartime Charleston: 1942-1945." Proceedings of the South Carolina Historical Association: 1997 (1997)  online .

Published in 21st century

External links

 
 
  (Local history)
  (Blog)
 Maps of Charleston, S.C., various dates 18th–19th century (via Boston Public Library)
 Items related to Charleston, S.C., various dates (via Digital Public Library of America).

 
Charleston
charleston
Years in South Carolina